Thomas Richter may refer to:
 Thomas Richter (footballer, born 1962), German footballer, played for Holstein Kiel, SSV Ulm 1846, Viktoria Aschaffenburg, Wuppertaler SV and VfB Lübeck, managed Wuppertaler SV
 Thomas Richter (footballer, born 1967), German footballer, won Bundesliga with 1. FC Kaiserslautern and & played for Hertha BSC Berlin, SV Waldhof Mannheim & managed Eintracht Trier
 Thomas Richter (footballer, born 1970), German footballer, played for Stuttgarter Kickers, Greuther Fürth, 1. FC Nuremberg,  TSV 1860 München, 1. FC Magdeburg & Bonner SC
 Thomas Richter (footballer, born 1980), German footballer, played for SV Elversberg, SV Darmstadt 98, Sportfreunde Siegen & SV Wehen Wiesbaden